Typhlodromips is a genus of mites in the Phytoseiidae family.

Species

 Typhlodromips ablusus (Schuster & Pritchard, 1963)
 Typhlodromips aciculus (De Leon, 1967)
 Typhlodromips ainu (Ehara, 1967)
 Typhlodromips akahirai (Ehara, 1966)
 Typhlodromips akilinik (Chant & Hansell, 1971)
 Typhlodromips alpicola (Ehara, 1982)
 Typhlodromips altiplanumi (Ke & Xin, 1982)
 Typhlodromips amilus (De Leon, 1967)
 Typhlodromips andamanicus (Gupta, 1980)
 Typhlodromips annae (Schicha & Gutierrez, 1985)
 Typhlodromips anuwati (Ehara & Bhandhufalck, 1977)
 Typhlodromips arbuti (De Leon, 1961)
 Typhlodromips arcus (De Leon, 1966)
 Typhlodromips arcus (Ryu, 1998)
 Typhlodromips arecae (Gupta, 1977)
 Typhlodromips ariri (Gondim Jr. & Moraes, 2001)
 Typhlodromips artemis (Denmark & Evans, in Denmark, Evans, Aguilar, Vargas & Ochoa 1999)
 Typhlodromips asiaticus (Evans, 1953)
 Typhlodromips assamensis (Chant, 1960)
 Typhlodromips assiniboin (Chant & Hansell, 1971)
 Typhlodromips auratus (De Leon, 1966)
 Typhlodromips avetianae (Arutunjan & Ohandjanian, 1972)
 Typhlodromips azerbaijanicus (Abbasova, 1970)
 Typhlodromips baiyunensis (Wu, 1982)
 Typhlodromips bangalorensis (Karg, 1983)
 Typhlodromips beelarong (Schicha & Corpuz-Raros, 1992)
 Typhlodromips benavidesi (Denmark & Andrews, 1981)
 Typhlodromips biflorus (Denmark & Evans, in Denmark, Evans, Aguilar, Vargas & Ochoa 1999)
 Typhlodromips bladderae (Denmark & Evans, in Denmark, Evans, Aguilar, Vargas & Ochoa 1999)
 Typhlodromips brevibrachii (Karg & Oomen-Kalsbeek, 1987)
 Typhlodromips bryophilus (Karg, 1970)
 Typhlodromips cananeiensis (Gondim Jr. & Moraes, 2001)
 Typhlodromips cantonensis (Schicha, 1982)
 Typhlodromips clinopodii (Ke & Xin, 1982)
 Typhlodromips collinellus (Athias-Henriot, 1966)
 Typhlodromips compressus (Wu & Li, 1984)
 Typhlodromips confertus (De Leon, 1959)
 Typhlodromips cornuformis (Schicha & Corpuz-Raros, 1992)
 Typhlodromips cotoensis (Muma, 1961)
 Typhlodromips cristobalensis (De Leon, 1962)
 Typhlodromips crotalariae (Gupta, 1977)
 Typhlodromips culmulus (van der Merwe, 1968)
 Typhlodromips daviesi (De Leon, 1966)
 Typhlodromips decolor (Hirschmann, 1962)
 Typhlodromips deleoni (Muma, 1962)
 Typhlodromips dentilis (De Leon, 1959)
 Typhlodromips digitulus (Denmark, 1965)
 Typhlodromips dillus (De Leon, 1959)
 Typhlodromips dimidiatus (De Leon, 1962)
 Typhlodromips dombeyus (Denmark & Evans, in Denmark, Evans, Aguilar, Vargas & Ochoa 1999)
 Typhlodromips draconis (Chaudhri, Akbar & Rasool, 1979)
 Typhlodromips driggeri (Specht, 1968)
 Typhlodromips echium (Beard, 2001)
 Typhlodromips enab (El-Badry, 1967)
 Typhlodromips eucalypterus (Prasad, 1968)
 Typhlodromips euserratus (Karg, 1993)
 Typhlodromips extrasetus (Moraes, Oliveira & Zannou, 2001)
 Typhlodromips ficus (El-Halawany & Abdeul-Samad, 1990)
 Typhlodromips filipinus (Schicha & Corpuz-Raros, 1992)
 Typhlodromips fordycei (De Leon, 1959)
 Typhlodromips fragilis (Kolodochka & Bondarenko, 1993)
 Typhlodromips friendi (De Leon, 1967)
 Typhlodromips frutexis (Karg, 1991)
 Typhlodromips genya (Pritchard & Baker, 1962)
 Typhlodromips gimanthus (Beard, 2001)
 Typhlodromips gonzalezi (Moraes & Mesa, 1991)
 Typhlodromips grandiductus (McMurtry & Moraes, 1985)
 Typhlodromips guizhouensis (Wu & Ou, 1999)
 Typhlodromips hamiltoni (Chant & Yoshida-Shaul, 1978)
 Typhlodromips hapoliensis (Gupta, 1986)
 Typhlodromips heidrunae (McMurtry & Schicha, 1987)
 Typhlodromips helanensis (Wu & Lan, 1991)
 Typhlodromips hellougreus (Denmark & Muma, 1967)
 Typhlodromips heterochaetus (Liang & Ke, 1984)
 Typhlodromips hidakai (Ehara & Bhandhufalck, 1977)
 Typhlodromips hinoki (Ehara, 1972)
 Typhlodromips huanggangensis (Wu, 1986)
 Typhlodromips ibadanensis (Ueckermann & Loots, 1988)
 Typhlodromips ignotus (Beard, 2001)
 Typhlodromips ihalmiut (Chant & Hansell, 1971)
 Typhlodromips ishikawai (Ehara, 1972)
 Typhlodromips isthmus (Denmark & Evans, in Denmark, Evans, Aguilar, Vargas & Ochoa 1999)
 Typhlodromips japonicus (Ehara, 1958)
 Typhlodromips jianyangensis (Wu, 1981)
 Typhlodromips jimenezi (Denmark & Evans, in Denmark, Evans, Aguilar, Vargas & Ochoa 1999)
 Typhlodromips johoreae (Muma, 1967)
 Typhlodromips josephi (Yoshida-Shaul & Chant, 1991)
 Typhlodromips jucara (Gondim Jr. & Moraes, 2001)
 Typhlodromips kakaibaeus (Schicha & Corpuz-Raros, 1992)
 Typhlodromips krantzi (Chant, 1959)
 Typhlodromips labis (Corpuz-Raros & Rimando, 1966)
 Typhlodromips lambatinus (Schicha & Corpuz-Raros, 1992)
 Typhlodromips leei (Schicha & Corpuz-Raros, 1992)
 Typhlodromips linharis (El-Banhawy, 1984)
 Typhlodromips lugubris (Chant & Baker, 1965)
 Typhlodromips lutezhicus (Wainstein, 1972)
 Typhlodromips madorellus (Athias-Henriot, 1966)
 Typhlodromips malaphilippinensis (Schicha & Corpuz-Raros, 1992)
 Typhlodromips mangleae (De Leon, 1967)
 Typhlodromips markwelli (Schicha, 1979)
 Typhlodromips masseei (Nesbitt, 1951)
 Typhlodromips mastus (Denmark & Muma, 1967)
 Typhlodromips meghalayensis (Gupta, 1978)
 Typhlodromips montdorensis (Schicha, 1979)
 Typhlodromips multisetosus (McMurtry & Moraes, 1985)
 Typhlodromips muricatus (Charlet & McMurtry, 1977)
 Typhlodromips napaeus (Wainstein, 1978)
 Typhlodromips nectae (Denmark & Evans, in Denmark, Evans, Aguilar, Vargas & Ochoa 1999)
 Typhlodromips neoarcus (Moraes & Kreiter, in Moraes, Kreiter & Lofego 2000)
 Typhlodromips neoclavicus (Denmark & Evans, in Denmark, Evans, Aguilar, Vargas & Ochoa 1999)
 Typhlodromips neocrotalariae (Gupta, 1978)
 Typhlodromips neoghanii (Gupta, 1986)
 Typhlodromips neomarkwelli (Schicha, 1980)
 Typhlodromips nestorus (Beard, 2001)
 Typhlodromips newsami (Evans, 1953)
 Typhlodromips occidentafricanus (Moraes, Oliveira & Zannou, 2001
 Typhlodromips officinaria (Gupta, 1975)
 Typhlodromips oguroi (Ehara, 1964)
 Typhlodromips okinawanus (Ehara, 1967)
 Typhlodromips papuaensis (McMurtry & Moraes, 1985)
 Typhlodromips paulus (Denmark & Muma, 1973)
 Typhlodromips pederosus (El-Banhawy, 1978)
 Typhlodromips pinicolus (Karg, 1991)
 Typhlodromips plumosus (Denmark & Muma, 1975)
 Typhlodromips polyantheae (Gupta, 1975)
 Typhlodromips proximus (Kolodochka, 1991)
 Typhlodromips qinghaiensis (Wang & Xu, 1991)
 Typhlodromips quadridens (Karg & Oomen-Kalsbeek, 1987)
 Typhlodromips quercicolus (De Leon, 1959)
 Typhlodromips rademacheri (Dosse, 1958)
 Typhlodromips rangatensis (Gupta, 1977)
 Typhlodromips reptans (Blommers, 1974)
 Typhlodromips robustus (Chant & Baker, 1965)
 Typhlodromips rykei (Pritchard & Baker, 1962)
 Typhlodromips saacharus (Wu, 1981)
 Typhlodromips sabaculus (Denmark & Muma, 1973)
 Typhlodromips sabali (De Leon, 1959)
 Typhlodromips sanblasensis (De Leon, 1962)
 Typhlodromips sapienticola (Gupta, 1977)
 Typhlodromips scleroticus De Leon, 1966
 Typhlodromips sessor (De Leon, 1962)
 Typhlodromips shi (Pritchard & Baker, 1962)
 Typhlodromips shoreae (Gupta, 1977)
 Typhlodromips siamensis (Ehara & Bhandhufalck, 1977)
 Typhlodromips sichuanensis (Wu & Li, 1985)
 Typhlodromips sigridae (Schicha, 1982)
 Typhlodromips sijiensis (Gupta, 1986)
 Typhlodromips similis (Koch, 1839)
 Typhlodromips simplicissimus (De Leon, 1959)
 Typhlodromips sinensis (Denmark & Muma, 1972)
 Typhlodromips sottoi (Schicha & Corpuz-Raros, 1992)
 Typhlodromips spinigerus (Chant & Baker, 1965)
 Typhlodromips stilus (Karg & Oomen-Kalsbeek, 1987)
 Typhlodromips sturti (Schicha, 1980)
 Typhlodromips swirskii (Athias-Henriot, 1962)
 Typhlodromips syzygii (Gupta, 1975)
 Typhlodromips tanzaniensis (Yoshida-Shaul & Chant, 1988)
 Typhlodromips tennesseensis (De Leon, 1962)
 Typhlodromips tenuis (Hirschmann, 1962)
 Typhlodromips tetranychivorus (Gupta, 1978)
 Typhlodromips theae (Wu, 1983)
 Typhlodromips tibetapineus (Wu, 1987)
 Typhlodromips tibetasalicis (Wu, 1987)
 Typhlodromips tienhsainensis (Tseng, 1983)
 Typhlodromips tubus (Schuster, 1966)
 Typhlodromips vagatus (Denmark & Evans, in Denmark, Evans, Aguilar, Vargas & Ochoa 1999)
 Typhlodromips varius (Hirschmann, 1962)
 Typhlodromips vertunculus (Karg & Oomen-Kalsbeek, 1987)
 Typhlodromips vestificus (Tseng, 1976)
 Typhlodromips vignae (Liang & Ke, 1981)
 Typhlodromips vineaticus (Wainstein, 1978)
 Typhlodromips violini (Meyer & Rodrigues, 1966)
 Typhlodromips volgini (Wainstein & Beglyarov, 1971)
 Typhlodromips wunde (Schicha & Corpuz-Raros, 1992)
 Typhlodromips xui (Yin, Bei & Lu, 1992)
 Typhlodromips yandala (Schicha & Corpuz-Raros, 1992)
 Typhlodromips yarnde (Schicha & Corpuz-Raros, 1992)
 Typhlodromips yarra (Schicha & Corpuz-Raros, 1992)
 Typhlodromips yera (Schicha & Corpuz-Raros, 1992)
 Typhlodromips yerracharta (Schicha & Corpuz-Raros, 1992)
 Typhlodromips yunnanensis (Wu, 1984)

References

Phytoseiidae